The 1888 Princeton Tigers football team represented Princeton University in the 1888 college football season. The team compiled an 11–1 record.  The team held its first ten opponents scoreless, winning those games by a combined 589 to 0 score. The team's sole loss was by a 10–0 score in the final game of the season against an undefeated Yale team that has been recognized as the 1888 national champion.

The practice of selecting All-American football teams began the following year with the 1890 College Football All-America Team. However, Princeton's roster in 1888 included a number of star players, including fullback Knowlton "Snake" Ames, end Jesse Riggs, right tackle Hector Cowan.

Schedule

References

Princeton
Princeton Tigers football seasons
Princeton Tigers football